Means of Evil is a collection of short stories by British writer Ruth Rendell.

Contents 
The collection contains five stories, all featuring Wexford:

 "Means of Evil"
 "Old Wives Tales"
 "Ginger and the Kingsmarkham Chalk Circle"
 "Achilles Heel"
 "When the Wedding Was Over"

Of these short stories, three were the basis of episodes in the Inspector Wexford television series - Means of Evil,  Ginger and the Kingsmarkham Chalk Circle (filmed as No Crying He Makes) and Achilles Heel.

External links 
 Means of Evil and Other Stories on Goodreads.

1979 short story collections
Crime short story collections
Short story collections by Ruth Rendell
Hutchinson (publisher) books
Inspector Wexford series